The Myth of the American Superhero is a scholarly non-fiction book by Robert Jewett and John Shelton Lawrence.

It describes the idealized, fantasy violence so distinctive for American pop culture. The authors show that the American heroic ideal, conveyed in formula stories of "the American monomyth," is explicitly anti-democratic and contagious. Crusading loners, attracted by guns, bombs, and the call to destroy evil, act out the premises of the myth with tragic consequences. This book shows how Oklahoma City bomber Timothy McVeigh and Unabomber Theodore Kaczynski have the courage of the mythic convictions ritually enacted by celebrity stars such as John Wayne, Clint Eastwood, and Steven Seagal.

The book, published in July 2002, explores the relationship between our entertainments of the past century, and national commitment to the ideals of democracy. Stories about superheroes—from the vigilante ideal launched by The Virginian novel a hundred years to the latest Spider-Man film or Touched by an Angel TV episode—express despair about self-managed government and the hope for redemption by powerful individuals who rise above law and institutions. The Myth of the American Superhero discusses novels, films, television shows, videogames and the behavior of national leaders inspired by myth.

Awards
 John Cawelti Award of the American Culture Association, Best Book of 2002
 Mythopoeic Society Scholarship Award in Myth and Fantasy Studies, 2004

References

American non-fiction books